Malaga (pronounced MA-la-ga) is an unincorporated community located within Franklin Township, in Gloucester County, New Jersey, United States. The area is served as United States Postal Service ZIP Code 08328.

As of the 2000 United States Census, the population for ZIP Code Tabulation Area 08328 was 1,476.

U.S. Route 40, Route 47 and Route 55 all pass through the Malaga area.

The community was named after Málaga, in Spain.

Demographics

Notable people

People who were born in, residents of, or otherwise closely associated with Malaga include:
 H. Jay Dinshah (1933-2000), founder and president of the American Vegan Society and editor of its publication, Ahimsa magazine 
 Ed Keegan (1939-2014), MLB pitcher who played for the Philadelphia Phillies and Kansas City Athletics.

References

External links
 Census 2000 Fact Sheet for Zip Code Tabulation Area 08328 from the United States Census Bureau

Franklin Township, Gloucester County, New Jersey
Unincorporated communities in Gloucester County, New Jersey
Unincorporated communities in New Jersey